The 2016–17 FC Krylia Sovetov Samara season is the club's second season back in the Russian Premier League, the highest tier of football in Russia, since their relegation at the end of the 2013–14 season, and 22nd in total.

Season events
On 1 November 2016, with the club in last position in the Russian Premier League table, manager Franky Vercauteren left Krylia Sovetov by mutual consent, with Hans Visser taking over in a caretaker capacity.

Squad

Youth squad

Transfers

Summer

In:

Out:

Winter

In:

Out:

Competitions

Russian Premier League

Results by round

Matches

League table

Russian Cup

Squad statistics

Appearances and goals

|-
|colspan="14"|Players away from the club on loan:
|-
|colspan="14"|Players who left Krylia Sovetov during the season:

|}

Goal Scorers

Disciplinary Record

References

External links
Official website 
Official website

PFC Krylia Sovetov Samara seasons
Krylia Sovetov Samara